The 1950 Italian Grand Prix was a Formula One motor race held on 3 September 1950 at Autodromo Nazionale di Monza. It was race 7 of 7 in  the 1950 World Championship of Drivers. In this race, Nino Farina became the first World Drivers' Champion, and the only driver to win the title in his home country.

Background 
Having already finished four times in the points (all second places), Fagioli would only be able to drop six points or not gain at all, while Fangio and Farina had only finished three times. All three of Fangio's finishes were wins.

To win the championship,
 For Fangio:
 Win or come 2nd to guarantee the title.
 Come 3rd, 4th or 5th with Farina 2nd or lower.
 With the fastest lap only, Farina 3rd or lower.
 Scoring no points, Farina would have to finish 3rd or lower without the fastest lap, 4th with; and Fagioli not to win with the fastest lap.
 For Fagioli:
 Win the race with the fastest lap, with Farina 3rd or lower, and Fangio not to score any points.
 For Farina:
 Win with the fastest lap, and Fangio 3rd or lower.
 Win without the fastest lap, and Fangio 4th or lower.
 2nd with fastest lap, and Fangio 5th or lower without fastest lap.
 3rd with fastest lap, and Fangio not to score.

Entries

 — Giovanni Bracco, Luigi de Filippis, Reg Parnell, Luigi Platé and Franco Bordoni all withdrew from the event prior to practice.
 — Dorino Serafini qualified and drove 47 laps of the race in the #48 Ferrari. Alberto Ascari, whose own vehicle had already retired, took over Serafini's car for the remaining 33 laps of the race.
 — Piero Taruffi qualified and drove 25 laps of the race in the #60 Alfa Romeo. Juan Manuel Fangio, whose own Alfa had already retired, took over Taruffi's car for a further 9 laps before again being forced to retire.

Race report 

Ferrari pulled out all the stops to impress at their home circuit, producing a new unsupercharged 4½ litre engine to try to end the Alfa Romeo monopoly. Alberto Ascari used it to achieve second place on the grid to Juan Manuel Fangio's Alfa Romeo 158 and then in the race behind the fast starting Nino Farina (Alfa Romeo 158) before briefly leading. The pace was too punishing for the new car and a porous block broke on lap 20 and the battle returned as usual to the Alfas. Fangio retired twice; once in his own Alfa Romeo 158 and a second time after taking over Piero Taruffi's. Farina led to the finish from Ascari who was now in teammate Dorino Serafini's Ferrari 375 with Luigi Fagioli finishing third in his Alfa Romeo 158. Louis Rosier finish fourth in his Talbot-Lago T26C with Philippe Étancelin fifth in his Lago-Talbot. Étancelin would become the oldest driver to ever score a world championship point with that finish. Only seven cars finished out of the 27 starters and with Farina's win and Fangio's failure to score and Fagioli's third place points removed as his worst scoring finish, Farina became the first recipient of the World Driver's Championship crown.

Classification

Qualifying

Race  

Notes
 – 1 point for fastest lap

Championship standings after the race 
Drivers' Championship standings

 Note: Only the top five positions are listed. Only the best 4 results counted towards the Championship. Numbers without parentheses are Championship points; numbers in parentheses are total points scored.

References 

Italian
Italian Grand Prix
1950 in Italian motorsport
Italian